The Long Range Aviation Group (Aviaciyna Grupa Dalnoi Aviacii); abbr. AGDA / АГДА), was a military organisation, subordinate to the Central High Command of the Ukrainian Air Force, which included the long-range aircraft of Ukraine. Ukrainian Long Range Aviation was disbanded in 2007.

History
After the fall of the Soviet Union, the Ukrainian Air Force was left with three air armies (1,100 combat aircraft), which included 30 Tu-16 missile carriers, 33 Tu-22KD missile carriers, 30 Tu-22R reconnaissance aircraft, 36 Tu-22M3s, 23 Tu-95MSs, 19 Tu-160s, 20 Ilyushin IL-78 aerial refueling aircraft, as well as large stockpiles of missiles: 1,068 Kh-55s and 423 Kh-22s.

In 1992 Ukraine also received much of the Soviet Black Sea Fleet, including the 2nd Guards Maritime Missile Aviation Division (Hvardiiske, Crimea), with three regiments of maritime attack Tu-22M2s and an independent Maritime Reconnaissance Aviation Regiment (Saki-Novofedorovka, Crimean Oblast) of Tu-22Ps. The 1995/96 edition of the Military Balance continued to list the remnant of these forces under now-Ukrainian Naval Aviation. In 1994 Tu-22M2s, Tu-16Ks and a large part of the Tupolev Tu-22Ps were put in storage and then dismantled.

The reasons for the elimination of Ukrainian long-range bombers included:
 The deep economic crisis in the Ukraine after the collapse of the USSR
 Pressure from the U.S. State Department on Ukraine
 Lack of support from production plants and design bureaus which remained in Russia
 Reduction in the size of the armed forces resulting in the loss of experienced pilots and supporting personnel
 Life expectancy of some aircraft components and assemblies had expired

Funding for the elimination of strategic aviation of Ukraine was allocated by the U.S. government as part of an agreement "to provide assistance to Ukraine in the elimination of strategic nuclear weapons and to prevent the proliferation of weapons of mass destruction", signed on November 25, 1993 between Ukraine and the United States. In 2000 in the agreement was extended to 31 December 2006.

Long-Range Aviation bases

Gallery

See also
 Poltava Museum of Long-Range and Strategic Aviation

References

External links

 
Ukrainian Air Force
Air Force
Air Force
1992 establishments in Ukraine
Military units and formations established in 1992
Military history of Ukraine